The Men's team sabre event of the 2018 World Fencing Championships was held on 24 and 25 July 2018.

Draw

Finals

Top half

Section 1

Section 2

Bottom half

Section 3

Section 4

Placement rounds

5–8th place bracket

9–16th place bracket

13–16th place bracket

References

External links
Bracket

2018 World Fencing Championships